Doctor Who at the BBC Radiophonic Workshop Volume 3: The Leisure Hive is the third in a series of compilations showcasing the BBC Radiophonic Workshop's work on the science-fiction programme Doctor Who. The album focused mainly on the Peter Howell synthesiser score for the 1980 serial The Leisure Hive, which received its first full release here. The compilation also collected some Dick Mills sound effects from the story as well as some effects from other 1980 serials Meglos and Full Circle, whose music would be the subject of the fourth volume in the series. The final track was a new remix of the original Delia Derbyshire version of the show's theme tune by series compiler Mark Ayres.

Track listing

Equipment
Equipment used on this compilation includes:
Yamaha CS-80
Roland 100M

External links
Producer's press release
Album information

BBC Radiophonic Workshop albums
Doctor Who soundtracks
2002 compilation albums